Hanna Laptsionak (born 16 December 1990) is a Belarusian female track cyclist, representing Belarus at international competitions. She competed at the 2016 UEC European Track Championships in the individual pursuit event and team pursuit event.

References

1990 births
Living people
Belarusian female cyclists
Belarusian track cyclists
Place of birth missing (living people)